Rebecca Frazier (née Hoggan; born ) is an American singer-songwriter, multi-instrumentalist, bluegrass musician and educator from Virginia. A recognized flatpicking guitarist, Frazier was the first woman to be featured on the cover of Flatpicking Guitar Magazine. A founding member of award-winning bluegrass group, Hit and Run, formerly based in Colorado, Frazier currently tours out of Nashville, Tennessee, and records under her own name. When We Fall is Frazier's most recent studio album.

Flatpicking Guitar
In September 2006, Flatpicking Guitar Magazine released an all-woman issue featuring Frazier on the cover, making her the first woman to hold this honor. In 2017, Paste featured Frazier in their piece about influential women in bluegrass, titled ‘7 Women Smashing the Bluegrass Glass Ceiling.’ Frazier was the first woman to be nominated for 'Guitar Performer of the Year' by the Society for the Preservation of Bluegrass Music of America (SPBGMA) in 2018, and was nominated again in 2019. Frazier has cited Tony Rice, Doc Watson, Clarence White, Jerry Garcia, and Russ Barenberg as influential to her playing.

References 

Year of birth missing (living people)
Living people
Guitarists from Virginia